Newchapel is a large hamlet in Surrey, England, that falls under the civil parish of Horne.. It lies on the A22 between Godstone and East Grinstead. It is the location of the London England Temple of the Church of Jesus Christ of Latter-day Saints (LDS Church). The temple, only open to followers of that religious group, has a visitors' centre where their beliefs are explained; visitors can also stroll in the grounds. The closest villages are Lingfield, Felbridge, Copthorne and Blindley Heath.

References

External links

Villages in Surrey
Tandridge